Too Hot to Stop is a 1976 album by the American funk group The Bar-Kays. It was their first album for Mercury Records.  It includes the hit "Shake Your Rump to the Funk".

Critical reception
The New Rolling Stone Record Guide deemed the album "unashamedly derivative Ohio Players funk." Despite this review, Too Hot To Stop is considered by funk fans to be one of the very best Bar-Kays albums. It’s content caused George Clinton, leader of Parliament-Funkadelic, to invite the Bar-Kays to be one of the opening acts on his band’s legendary 1976-77 P-Funk Earth Tour.

Track list
 "Too Hot To Stop, Pt. 1" (Fred Freeman, Harry Nehls III, Larry Dodson, James Alexander, Michael Beard, Winston Stewart, Lloyd Smith, Charles Allen, Harvey Henderson, Frank Thompson)	- 6:31
 "Cozy" (James Banks, Henderson Thigpen) - 3:36
 "Bang, Bang (Stick 'Em Up)" (Dodson, Alexander, Beard, Stewart, Smith, Allen, Henderson, Thompson)	- 3:48
 "Spellbound" (Banks, Thigpen) - 5:05
 "Shake Your Rump to the Funk" (Dodson, Alexander, Beard, Stewart, Smith, Allen, Henderson, Thompson)	- 3:52
 "You're So Sexy" (Dodson, Alexander, Beard, Stewart, Smith, Allen, Henderson, Thompson) - 3:53
 "Summer of Our Love" (Dodson, Alexander, Beard, Stewart, Smith, Allen, Henderson, Thompson) - 4:25
 "Whitehouseorgy" (Howard Redmond, L. Hendricks, R. CoCo, P. Kibbie) - 4:48

References

1976 albums
Bar-Kays albums
Mercury Records albums